Wayne Dumont, Jr. (June 25, 1914 – March 19, 1992) was an American Republican Party politician from New Jersey. He represented Warren County in the New Jersey Senate from 1952 to 1966 and northwestern New Jersey more broadly from 1968 until his retirement in 1990. He was the Republican nominee for Governor of New Jersey in 1965, losing to Richard J. Hughes.

Early life and education
Wayne Dumont Jr. was born on June 25, 1914 in Paterson, New Jersey. His father, Wayne Dumont Sr., was a native of Phillipsburg, New Jersey and prominent attorney and bank director in Paterson.

Wayne Jr. graduated from Montclair Academy. While he was attending Montclair, his father died of heart disease. Wayne Jr. then attended Lafayette College, his father's alma mater, in Easton, Pennsylvania. After graduating, he became a minor league pitcher for the former St. Louis Browns but decided to study law at the University of Pennsylvania Law School. After receiving his law degree, he moved to Phillipsburg in 1940, where he began practicing law.

Dumont served in World War II and assisted in the prosecution of Japanese war criminals.

New Jersey Senate
Dumont was elected in 1951 as a Republican to represent Warren County in the New Jersey Senate; he was the first Republican to represent the county in nearly 75 years.

He was re-elected in 1955, 1959 and 1963, during which time he served as Senate Majority Leader, Senate President and Acting Governor of New Jersey. He was responsible for sponsoring well over 500 bills during his legislative career including the state's first school aid bill and farmland preservation law.

Gubernatorial campaigns

Dumont ran for Governor of New Jersey three times in 1957, 1961, and 1965.

He narrowly won the Republican nomination in 1965 against fellow State Senator Charles W. Sandman. Dumont's support of a state sales tax was an issue in the primary campaign, possibly attributing to the narrow margin. In the general election against incumbent Governor Richard J. Hughes, Dumont lost in a landslide. He made a campaign issue out of the pro-Marxist speeches of Rutgers University professor Eugene D. Genovese.

Dumont returned to the State Senate in 1967. In 1976, he was the only Republican to support Governor Brendan Byrne's call for a state income tax. Despite his opponents focus on the income tax, he was re-elected in 1977.

In 1988, he suffered a stroke, leading him to retire in 1990, before the end of his term.

Personal life
Dumont married Helen S. Williamson on September 19, 1938. Their son W. Hunt Dumont served as United States Attorney for the District of New Jersey from 1981 to 1985.

From 1954 to 1960 he served as a member of the board of trustees to his alma mater, Lafayette College.

Death and legacy
Dumont died at the age of 77 on March 19, 1992, due to congestive heart failure suffered at Warren Hospital in Phillipsburg, New Jersey. Governor James Florio ordered all flags in the state flown at half mast.

The Warren County Administration Building in Belvidere, New Jersey is named after Dumont.

References

External links
Executive order memorializing Wayne Dumont, Governor James J. Florio, March 20, 1992
Administrative History of the Teach-ins at Rutgers University, Special Collections and University Archives, Rutgers University Libraries, April 27, 1992

1914 births
1992 deaths
Lafayette College alumni
Montclair Kimberley Academy alumni
Republican Party New Jersey state senators
Politicians from Paterson, New Jersey
People from Phillipsburg, New Jersey
Presidents of the New Jersey Senate
University of Pennsylvania Law School alumni
20th-century American politicians
Lafayette College trustees
20th-century American academics